Clar Marie Duncan Weah (née Duncan; born March 11, 1965) is a Jamaican businesswoman, philanthropist, advocate, and the current First Lady of the Republic of Liberia. She is the spouse of George Manneh Weah, the 25th President of the Republic of Liberia, elected in 2017. Clar established the Clar Hope Foundation in 2018, with the goal of improving the livelihoods of the least privileged  in Liberia.

Biography

Early life and career 
Clar Marie Duncan was born in Kingston, Jamaica, and is the youngest of seven children. In her early youth, she migrated along with her family to the United States of America. In the United States, she attended the City University of New York and earned her nursing license and a bachelor's degree in Health Sciences. She launched her career working as a customer service representative in New York at both Citibank and Chase Manhattan Bank, during which time she, in conjunction, managed small businesses.

She later pursued her studies leading her to a nursing career. She worked at Jamaica Hospital in New York City.

Marriage and children
Clar met George Weah, the then soccer star, in the early 90s at Chase Manhattan Bank in New York, where she was serving as a customer service representative. They married on June 26, 1993, and have three children – Martha Weah, George Weah Jr., and Timothy Weah. Their sons are international football players.

Office of the First Lady 2018 – present  
Following the election of her husband as the 25th President of Liberia, Weah started her role as the First Lady of the Republic of Liberia,. She set out to develop programs and social projects that encompass services targeting the assistance of orphans, street children, the elderly, women, and girls, with a focus on rural settings.

In 2018,  the Clar Hope Foundation was founded as a non-political initiative. The foundation aims to assist disadvantaged children, youth and women. Its objectives focus on delivering essential educational and emergency healthcare as a universal and constitutional health-right to every Liberian citizen.

The Clar Hope Foundation came from the merger of sustainable development solutions.

In June 2019, President Weah launched Clar Weah's flagship initiative, the "She's You" movement.
 According to its mission statement, it aims to advance gender equality through the promotion of women's empowerment and fight to end all forms of violence and detrimental practices against women, girls, and children. The She's You movement objectives are to create a conducive environment for women and girls to live free of violence, rape, gender inequalities At the launch of "She's You", President Weah disclosed that on his wife's initiative, the new home for the elderly in Grand Bassa County was almost ready for use.

In September 2020, at the launch of the Liberian Anti-SGBV Conference, Clar Weah reiterated that there was no excuse for rape in her country. She explained that despite her efforts with the Ministry of Gender, Children and Social Protection, sexual and gender based violence continued. "But with all our efforts," she explained, "SGBV persists. It is sickening to hear children as young as 10 years old are being raped." She cited improved awareness of SGBV and the education of men and boys as priorities for reducing threats of violence again women.

Honours
Weah was appointed in March 2018, at a Women Symposium in Morocco, Ambassador and Champion for Women's Football, by the Confederation of African Football.

Weah was appointed a Merck Foundation ''More than a Mother'' Ambassador to Liberia.

References

1965 births
Living people
First ladies and gentlemen of Liberia
Liberian women's rights activists
People from Kingston, Jamaica
Weah family
21st-century Liberian women